is a former Japanese badminton player from the Yonex team. Iwata graduated from the Shijonawate Gakuen Junior College. she competed at the Summer Olympics in Sydney, Australia. Iwata was the women's doubles champion at the National Championships in 1996 and 1998. She won some international tournament in Australia, Cuba, Guatemala, and Carebaco in 2003, also in Peru in 2004. She was selected as Yonex badminton manager in 2010.

Achievements

Asian Championships 
Women's doubles

IBF World Grand Prix
The World Badminton Grand Prix sanctioned by International Badminton Federation (IBF) since 1983.

Women's doubles

IBF International
Women's doubles

References

External links
 
 

1971 births
Living people
Sportspeople from Osaka Prefecture
Japanese female badminton players
Olympic badminton players of Japan
Badminton players at the 2000 Summer Olympics
Badminton players at the 1998 Asian Games
Badminton players at the 2002 Asian Games
Asian Games bronze medalists for Japan
Asian Games medalists in badminton
Medalists at the 1998 Asian Games
21st-century Japanese women
20th-century Japanese women